Gometz-la-Ville is a French communes in the Essonne department in the southern suburbs of Paris (25 km) from the center of Paris. Inhabitants of Gometz-la-Ville are named Gometziens.

Geography
The village is near Les Ulis, Limours, Gif-sur-Yvette and Gometz-le-Châtel, along the old road from Paris to Chartres, crossing the Hurepoix.

History
 A train line was built from Paris to Chartres via Gallardon, at the beginning of the 20th century, with a station in the nearby town of Gometz-le-Châtel. It was used from 1931 to 1939, but there is no traffic nowadays. The nearest station on the Paris RER B line are Bures-sur-Yvette station and La Hacquinière station, which are accessed by bus.
 An experimental Aérotrain was built, from Gometz-le-Châtel to Rambouillet, for test, from 1966 to 1977, from a creation of Jean Bertin (train engineer). This project was stopped, for TGV's one, using right now.

Places to see
 Saint-Germain's church built during the 12th century.

Economy
 Space Station of France Télécom R&D (old name CNET)

See also
Communes of the Essonne department

References

External links

Official website 
Mayors of Essonne Association 

Communes of Essonne